Wronów may refer to the following places in Poland:
Wronów, Lower Silesian Voivodeship (south-west Poland)
Wronów, Lublin County in Lublin Voivodeship (east Poland)
Wronów, Puławy County in Lublin Voivodeship (east Poland)
Wronów, Świętokrzyskie Voivodeship (south-central Poland)
Wronów, Krotoszyn County in Greater Poland Voivodeship (west-central Poland)
Wronów, Pleszew County in Greater Poland Voivodeship (west-central Poland)
Wronów, Opole Voivodeship (south-west Poland)